Elaine Banner or Elaine Walters is a fictional and supporting character appearing in American comic books published by Marvel Comics. The character appeared later in multiple spin-offs and dramatizations of the Hulk and She-Hulk comic book titles. She was created by writer David Kraft and artist Mike Vosburg. She first appeared in The Savage She-Hulk #15 of April, in 1981. She is the sister of Susan and Brian Banner, the wife of Morris Walters, and the Aunt of Bruce Banner who would grow up to be the Gamma-Powered superhero known as the Hulk; while her daughter and Bruce's cousin would become the super-heroine known as The She-Hulk, when Bruce saved her life with a blood transfusion.

The character appears in the Marvel Cinematic Universe Disney+ series She-Hulk: Attorney at Law (2022), portrayed by Tess Malis Kincaid.

Publication history
Elaine Banner was created by Writer David Kraft and artist Mike Vosburg in The Savage She-Hulk #15 of April, back in 1981.

Fictional character biography
Elaine Banner is the sister of Susan Banner and Brian Banner. During their childhood, all three of them including their Mother were physically and mentally abused by their alcoholic father, Bruce Banner. For years they suffered but eventually they pulled through until he died. Even though Elaine and Susan learned to put it behind them' their brother Brian was not so fortunate.

Susan, Elaine and Brian all wanted to move on with their lives but Brian was still suffering from the trauma of their childhood together and would do everything he could to spend as little time with his siblings as possible because he didn't want to relive anymore bad memories, straining the relationship between them. Susan married a man by the name of Drake, and Brian ended up marrying a woman named Rebecca. 

Elaine married Morris Walters, becoming Elaine Walters, and soon after gave birth to their daughter, Jennifer. Morris hoped that Jennifer would become a police officer like him, but Elaine supported her daughter's ambitions to become a professional dancer growing up instead.

Since Morris was the Sheriff of the Los Angeles County Sheriff Department, he came across many enemies, the biggest one being the mobster Nicholas Trask. Trask planned to murder Morris by making his death look like a drunk driving accident, but his plan backfired when Elaine had been the one driving to see Jennifer’s dance recital with two of her friends.

In other media

Television
 Elaine Banner Walters was seen on The Incredible Hulk episode "Down Memory Lane."
 Tess Malis Kincaid plays Elaine Banner in the Disney+ series She-Hulk: Attorney at Law.

References

1. The Savage She-Hulk #15

External links
 https://www.comicvine.com/elaine-ann-walters/4005-80352/
 https://marvel.fandom.com/Elaine_Banner_(Earth-616)
 

Characters created by David Anthony Kraft
Comics characters introduced in 1981
Marvel Comics female characters